This is a list of Slovak football transfers in the winter transfer window 2015–2016 by club. Only transfers of the Fortuna Liga and DOXXbet liga are included.

Fortuna Liga

FK AS Trenčín

In:

Out:

ŠK Slovan Bratislava

In:

Out:

Spartak Myjava

In:

Out:

MŠK Žilina

In:

Out:

FC DAC 1904 Dunajská Streda

In:

Out:

FC Spartak Trnava

In:

Out:

FK Senica

In:

Out:

MFK Ružomberok

In:

Out:

FC ViOn Zlaté Moravce

In:

Out:

MFK Zemplín Michalovce

In:

Out:

FO ŽP Šport Podbrezová

In:

Out:

MFK Skalica

In:

Out:

DOXXbet liga

FK Pohronie

In:

 

Out:

FK Iskra Borčice

In:

Out:

MŠK Žilina B

In:

Out:

AFC Nové Mesto nad Váhom

In:

Out:

ŠKF Sereď

In:

Out:

FC Nitra

In:

 

Out:

OFK Dunajská Lužná

In:

 

Out:

FK Dukla Banská Bystrica

In:

Out:

FK Slovan Duslo Šaľa

In:

 
 

Out:

ŠK Slovan Bratislava juniori

In:

Out:

ŠK Senec

In:

 

Out:

FC Spartak Trnava juniori

In:

Out:

FC VSS Košice

In:

Out:

1. FC Tatran Prešov

In:

Out:

MFK Tatran Liptovský Mikuláš

In:

 

Out:

MFK Lokomotíva Zvolen

In:

Out:

FK Poprad

In:

Out:

Partizán Bardejov

In:

Out:

FC Lokomotíva Košice

In:

Out:

FK Haniska

In:

 

Out:

MFK Dolný Kubín
withdrew from the league due to financial problems

FK Spišská Nová Ves

In:

 

Out:

OFK Teplička nad Váhom

In:

 

Out:

MŠK Rimavská Sobota

In:

 
 
 

Out:

See also
 2015–16 Fortuna Liga

References

External links
 Official site  
 Profutbal.sk 
 Official site of the SFZ 
 Sport.sk 

Transfers
2015-16
Slovak